The First Brazauskas Cabinet was the 12th cabinet of Lithuania since 1990. It consisted of the Prime Minister and 13 government ministers.

History 
Algirdas Brazauskas, the leader of the Social Democratic Party of Lithuania, was appointed the Prime Minister by President Valdas Adamkus on 4 July 2001, after the resignation of the previous government of Rolandas Paksas. The 12th cabinet received its mandate and started its work on 12 July 2001, after the Seimas gave assent to its program.

The government served until the end of the term of the Eighth Seimas and returned its mandate on 15 November 2004, after the elections in October. The government continued to serve in an acting capacity until the new government (also headed by Brazauskas) started its work on 14 December 2004.

Cabinet
The following ministers served on the First Brazauskas Cabinet.

References 

Cabinet of Lithuania
2001 establishments in Lithuania
2004 disestablishments in Lithuania
Cabinets established in 2001
Cabinets disestablished in 2004